Javier Martínez is an American attorney, activist, and politician serving as a member of the New Mexico House of Representatives from the 11th district, which includes Bernalillo County, New Mexico.

Early life and education 
Martínez was raised in Albuquerque, New Mexico. The son of immigrants, Martínez became the first in his family to attend college. He earned a bachelor's degree and Juris Doctor in international and comparative law from the University of New Mexico.

Career 
After graduating from law school, Martínez worked as a community organizer in Albuquerque, New Mexico. Martínez works as a policy director and general counsel at the Partnership for Community Action in South Valley, New Mexico, and previously worked as a public health advocate at the University of Michigan. Martínez was elected to the New Mexico House of Representatives in 2014 and took office on January 20, 2015, succeeding Democratic incumbent Rick Miera. 

On August 10, 2021, Martínez was selected to succeed Sheryl Williams Stapleton as majority leader of the House. 

In December 2022, a suspect shot at Martínez's home. No injuries were reported. Solomon Peña, an unsuccessful Republican candidate for state representative, was later arrested in connection with the shooting, along with several other shootings that targeted Democratic politicians in Albuquerque.

References 

21st-century American politicians
Activists from New Mexico
Hispanic and Latino American state legislators in New Mexico
Living people
Democratic Party members of the New Mexico House of Representatives
New Mexico lawyers
University of New Mexico School of Law alumni
Year of birth missing (living people)